Carl's Ice Cream (also known as "Carl's Frozen Custard" or, most often, simply "Carl's") is a curbside ice cream stand located at 2200 Princess Anne Street, Fredericksburg, Virginia.  Since 2005, the stand, with its Art Moderne architectural facade, has been listed on the National Register of Historic Places.

History
Carl Sponseller founded Carl's Frozen Custard stand in 1947.  The original building was registered as a National Landmark and is an official register of Historic Places in 2005.  Since 1947, the 1940s era Electro Freeze machines have produced the frozen custard daily.  Custard is different from ice cream because it contains eggs,  and sells only three flavors, Vanilla, Chocolate, and Strawberry.  When Carl retired he passed it to his brothers, Paul Sponseller and Herbert Sponseller.  When they in turn retired it was passed to Ramona Sponseller (Settle), Daniel Sponseller, and Cristina Sponseller (McCann); keeping it in the family. The stand has what can only be called a devoted following, to the point that the line of customers often stretches around the building, even in bad weather.  Carl's is seasonal, and closed each year from the Sunday before Thanksgiving until the Friday of Presidents Day Weekend.

See also
 National Register of Historic Places listings in Virginia

References

External links

 Carl's Frozen Custard official website
 Carl's at the DHR website
 "An Ice Cream Show", PBS show

Commercial buildings on the National Register of Historic Places in Virginia
Buildings and structures in Fredericksburg, Virginia
National Register of Historic Places in Fredericksburg, Virginia
Streamline Moderne architecture in Virginia
Restaurants in Virginia
Ice cream parlors in the United States
Tourist attractions in Fredericksburg, Virginia
Commercial buildings completed in 1947
Restaurants established in 1947
1947 establishments in Virginia
Restaurants on the National Register of Historic Places